Statistics of Swedish football Division 3 for the 2010 season.

League standings

Norra Norrland 2010

Mellersta Norrland 2010

Södra Norrland 2010

Norra Svealand 2010

Västra Svealand 2010

Södra Svealand 2010

Nordöstra Götaland 2010

Nordvästra Götaland 2010

Mellersta Götaland 2010

Sydöstra Götaland 2010

Sydvästra Götaland 2010

Södra Götaland 2010

Footnotes

References 

Swedish Football Division 3 seasons
5
Sweden
Sweden